Margareta Budner (born 11 June 1975) is a Polish politician. She was elected to the Senate of Poland (10th term) representing the constituency of Konin. She was also elected to the 6th term and 9th term of the Senate of Poland.

References 

Living people
1975 births
Place of birth missing (living people)
20th-century Polish politicians
21st-century Polish politicians
20th-century Polish women politicians
21st-century Polish women politicians
Members of the Senate of Poland 2005–2007
Members of the Senate of Poland 2015–2019
Members of the Senate of Poland 2019–2023
Women members of the Senate of Poland